Steve Hochstadt is a professor emeritus of history at Illinois College in Jacksonville, Illinois. He joined the faculty in 2006 after teaching for 27 years at Bates College in Maine. He has done extensive research on Jewish refugees who fled to Shanghai. Influenced by his grandparents, Viennese Jews who fled the Holocaust and immigrated to Shanghai, Hochstadt conducted 100 interviews with former refugees now living in the United States and Europe. Based on his studies he wrote several books about the Holocaust and especially about Jewish refugees in Asia. Hochstadt holds the position of treasurer at the Sino-Judaic Institute, a non profit organization that promotes cooperation in matters of mutual historic and cultural interest between Chinese and Jewish people. Steve Hochstadt is a frequent contributor to the LA Progressive, an online social justice magazine.

Publications 
 Mobility and Modernity: Migration in Germany, 1820-1989 - University of Michigan Press 1999
 Sources of the Holocaust - Palgrave Macmillan 2004
 Shanghai Geschichten - Hentrich and Hentrich 2007
 Exodus to Shanghai: Stories of Escape from the Third Reich - Palgrave Macmillan 2012
 Freedom of the Press in Small-Town America: My Opinions - Atlantic Publishing 2020
 Death and Love in the Holocaust: The Story of Sonja and Kurt Messerschmidt - Academic Studies Press 2022

Sources

External links 
 Steve Hochstadt's page at History News Network

1948 births
Living people
21st-century American historians
21st-century American male writers
Bates College faculty
Illinois College faculty
American male non-fiction writers